is a Japanese former backstroke swimmer. He competed in two events at the 1968 Summer Olympics.

References

External links
 

1946 births
Living people
Japanese male backstroke swimmers
Olympic swimmers of Japan
Swimmers at the 1968 Summer Olympics
Sportspeople from Hiroshima
Asian Games medalists in swimming
Asian Games silver medalists for Japan
Swimmers at the 1966 Asian Games
Medalists at the 1966 Asian Games
20th-century Japanese people